The siege of Ahmednagar was the first battle of the Second Anglo-Maratha War fought between the Maratha Confederacy and the British East India Company.

When he determined that a long defensive war would ruin his army, Wellesley decided to act boldly to defeat the numerically larger force of the Maratha Empire.

With the logistic assembly of his army complete (24,000 men in total) he gave the order to break camp and attack the nearest Maratha fort on 8 August 1803.

Wellesley's first move was to take the  walled Pettah of Ahmednagar (town adjacent to the fort) by escalade, on the same day (the 8 August).

The Ahmednagar Fort surrendered on 12 August after an infantry attack had exploited an artillery-made breach in the wall. With the pettah and fort now in British control Wellesley was able to extend control southwards to the river Godavari.

Notes

References

Conflicts in 1803
1803 in India
Battles of the Second Anglo-Maratha War
Battles involving the Maratha Empire
Battles involving the British East India Company
History of the Corps of Engineers (Indian Army)
August 1803 events